The Jojo Addiction is a Czech single-place paraglider that was designed and produced by Jojo Wings of Roudnice nad Labem. It is now out of production.

Design and development
The Addiction was designed as an advanced performance glider. The models are each named for their relative size.

Operational history
Reviewer Noel Bertrand noted the very low price of the Addiction in a 2003 review, saying "the prices are very interesting".

Variants
Addiction S
Small-sized model for lighter pilots. The glider model is AFNOR Performance certified.
Addiction M
Mid-sized model for medium-weight pilots. The glider model is AFNOR Performance certified.

Specifications (Addiction M)

References

Addiction
Paragliders